The Magic Roundabout in High Wycombe, Buckinghamshire, England, is similar to the roundabouts with the same name in Hemel Hempstead and other places. It is located on the junction of the A40 and A404 roads. The junction is the second meeting point of the two roads; they interchange at the start of the A404 in Marylebone, London, with the A40 forming the Westway.
The two roads follow different routes to reach Wycombe, the A40 coming via Beaconsfield and the A404 via North London and Amersham. From the roundabout, the A40 continues towards Oxford, Cheltenham, Gloucester and South Wales, whilst the A404 goes south to Marlow and Maidenhead.

See also
 Magic Roundabout (Colchester)
 Magic Roundabout (Hemel Hempstead)
 Magic Roundabout (Swindon)
 Denham Roundabout
 Google Maps satellite image view

H
High Wycombe
Road junctions in England
Transport in Buckinghamshire